Latrape is a commune in the Haute-Garonne department in southwestern France.

Geography
The commune is bordered by eight other communes, seven of them is in Haute-Garonne, and one in Ariège: Lacaugne to the north, Carbonne and Rieux-Volvestre to the northwest, Castagnac to the east, Canens to the southeast, Bax to the south, Mailholas to the west, and finally by the department of Ariège to the northeast by the commune of Lézat-sur-Lèze.

Population

See also
Communes of the Haute-Garonne department

References

Communes of Haute-Garonne